Tabia may refer to:

tabia (or tabiya), a term used in chess for a standard position in the opening
Tabia , an administrative division in Ethiopia
Tabia, Taroudant, town and rural commune of Morocco
Tabia, Azilal, a town and rural commune of Morocco
Tabya, Sid Bel Abbés, a town and commune in Algeria
Tavium, ancient settlement in Galatia, present-day Turkey